The Saltire Prize, named after the flag of Scotland, was the national award for advances in the commercial development of marine energy.

To be considered for the £10 million award, teams had to demonstrate, in Scottish waters, a commercially viable wave or tidal stream energy technology "that achieves the greatest volume of electrical output over the set minimum hurdle of 100GWh over a continuous 2-year period using only the power of the sea."

The Saltire Prize was open to any individual, team or organisation from across the world who believed they had wave or tidal energy technology capable of fulfilling the challenge. Applications could be submitted between March 2010 and January 2015.

Additional prizes

• The Saltire Prize Lecture - delivered at the Scottish Renewables Marine Conference every September, it focused on the challenges in converting our world lead in wave and tidal energy to an industry of commercial scale, and in securing the economic, environmental and social benefits that this industry can bring. The lecture was designed to promote knowledge exchange between academics, industry, financiers and government.

• The Saltire Prize Medal - created to recognise outstanding contributions to the development of marine renewable energy. The Medal was awarded every March at the Scottish Renewables Annual Conference, Exhibition and Dinner.

• The Junior Saltire Prize - launched in 2011, this was aimed at primary and secondary school pupils and was designed to help raise awareness of the opportunities that Scotland has to exploit its marine renewables potential. It was sponsored by Skills Development Scotland and awards are presented to teams in three age groups: p5-7, s1-3 and s4-6.

• A Saltire Prize-sponsored doctorate in collaboration with the Energy Technology Partnership (ETP) - This was announced in August 2012. The research would consider how marine energy projects can be designed to maximise economic energy production while protecting the environment.

• Power of the Sea - a one-off junior photography competition sponsored by the Saltire Prize, aimed at raising awareness of the natural environment and its potential for marine energy. In December 2012, four young photographers from Scottish primary schools were selected by renowned Scottish photographer, David Eustace, as the national winners.

History
When it was first announced in 2008 it was the world's largest ever single prize for innovation in marine renewable energy.

The prize was overseen by the Challenge Committee. Saltire Prize policy was the responsibility of the Offshore Renewables Policy Team in the Scottish Government's Energy and Climate Change Directorate.

Competitors
Pelamis Wave Power, ScottishPower Renewables, Aquamarine Power and MeyGen are all companies that entered the race for the Saltire Prize, in a phase of the contest that ran until 2017.

Saltire Prize Medal
In 2011 the inaugural Saltire Prize Medal was awarded to Professor Stephen Salter, who led the team which designed the Salter's Duck device in the 1970s. Dr Richard Yemm was awarded the medal in 2012. Professor Peter Fraenkel, MBE, a pioneer for the development of marine turbines, won the 2013 medal. and the 2014 medal went to Allan Thomson of Aquamarine Power.

See also

 List of engineering awards
 Crown Estate
 Marine Scotland
 Renewables Obligation
 Scottish Adjacent Waters Boundaries Order 1999
 Tidal stream generator
 Wave farm

References

External links
 Official website

2007 establishments in Scotland
2007 in science
Awards established in 2007
British science and technology awards
Business and industry awards
Electrical engineering awards
Renewable energy in Scotland
Renewable energy technology
Science and technology in Scotland
Scottish awards
Scottish coast
Scottish Government
Sustainability in Scotland
Sustainable development
Tidal power
Wave power